Bożena Mamontowicz-Łojek (22 December 1937 – 10 April 2010) was a Polish historian and activist. She studied history of Polish theater and ballet. She was President of the Polish Katyn Foundation. She was wife of Jerzy Łojek, historian.

She died in the 2010 Polish Air Force Tu-154 crash near Smolensk on 10 April 2010. She was posthumously awarded the Order of Polonia Restituta.

References

1937 births
2010 deaths
Historians of theatre
Federation of Katyn Families
Burials at Powązki Cemetery
University of Warsaw alumni
Officers of the Order of Polonia Restituta
Recipients of the Gold Cross of Merit (Poland)
Victims of the Smolensk air disaster